The American University of the Caribbean School of Medicine (AUC) is a  private for-profit medical school. Its main basic science campus is located in Sint Maarten, and administrative offices are located in Miramar, Florida, in the United States. AUC is owned by Adtalem Global Education.

History

Montserrat
Founded by American educator Dr. Paul Tien in 1978. The main campus of the American University of the Caribbean was originally located on the island of Montserrat. However, the university had to be evacuated in 1995 due to volcanic activity in the Soufrière Hills. The campus remained closed for two years, until it was finally destroyed by pyroclastic flow from the volcano in 1997.

St. Maarten

AUC purchased a parcel of land in the village of Cupecoy on the Dutch side of St. Martin and construction of a permanent campus began in July 1996. The new campus opened on 1 May 1998. AUC's new campus consists of teaching and learning facilities featuring classrooms and laboratories, an imaging anatomy lab, a microbiology lab, and a medical library. The school was purchased by Adtalem Global Education in 2011 for $235 million. The current dean of AUC is Pedro Delgado.

Hurricane Irma 
Hurricane Irma struck Sint Maarten on September 5 and 6 2017 and the AUC campus, including the dormitories, suffered minor damage but classes had to be canceled and all students were evacuated off the island of Sint Maarten, as the island attempted to restore basic services. According to the AUC's official hurricane update page, students were sheltered in a building that was engineered and designed to withstand a category 5 hurricane (Building 2). Supplies were distributed to sheltered students, colleagues, and loved ones in the storm's aftermath. Several residences, where students were staying, were "completely destroyed--and food and water is scarce", according to the CBC. The school arranged for students to start the next semester on September 29, 2017, having made an arrangements with a North West England university (University of Central Lancashire) to share their facilities until students were able to return to the Sint Maarten campus.

Curriculum

After completing the initial 5 semesters (20 months) of study in the Medical Sciences portion on AUC's St. Maarten campus, students then conduct 4.5 semesters (18 months) of training in the Clinical Sciences portion (also known as the Clinical Years) at AUC's affiliated community hospitals, whereby the students may choose between community hospitals in the United States or The United Kingdom. Both the required core rotations (Internal Medicine, Surgery, Pediatrics, OB/GYN, and Psychiatry) and elective rotations in any specialty may be taken at one or several different clinical sites. BronxCare Hospital System is the largest clinical site that AUC has a contract with.  The tuition for medical sciences is $23,800/semester, while the tuition for clinical sciences is $26,624/semester.

Outcomes

315 U.S. students graduated from the MD program in 2019. 200 of those students graduated on time, for an on-time percentage of 63.49%. AUC claims that 355 graduates matched in 2019, 340 in 2020, 304 in 2021, and 280 in 2022.

Accreditation, recognition and licensure
Since 2011, AUC has been accredited by Accreditation Commission of Colleges of Medicine, which accredits Caribbean medical schools. AUC is accredited by the Accreditation Commission of Colleges of Medicine (ACCM), an independent organization based in Ireland that accredits medical schools on behalf of several governments, including the government of Sint Maarten. AUC is included in the list of approved schools recognized by the Medical Board of California, a list that is frequently used throughout the United States by ACGME-accredited residency programs to validate international medical school credentials for postgraduate training. AUC is listed with the World Directory of Medical Schools' directory  which indicates that students and graduates of this medical school are eligible to apply to ECFMG for ECFMG Certification.  Some states have their own approval processes for medical schools, all of which have approved AUC. These include California. AUC is approved by the New York State Education Department (NYSED) to allow students to complete more than 12 weeks of clinical clerkships in New York State. AUC is one of eight Caribbean medical schools so approved by NYSED.  Additionally, Florida has approved AUC to allow medical students to do clinical rotations in that state. AUC graduates (post September 2019) are eligible for registration with the General Medical Council in the United Kingdom, which as a result means that graduates can complete postgraduate (residency) training or work at any stage of their careers as practicing clinicians in the UK.

Student loan debt
The US Department of Education reports that median student loan debt is $331,634 for students who have completed the program.

Notable faculty 

 Pedro L. Delgado, dean of AUC since 2021
 Heidi Chumley, AUC provost 2013-2021, dean of the Ross University School of Medicine
 Paul Tien, founder of AUC

See also

 International medical graduate
 List of medical schools in the Caribbean

References

External links 
 

1978 establishments in Montserrat
Educational institutions established in 1978
History of Montserrat
Schools of medicine in Sint Maarten
Medical schools in Florida
Schools in Montserrat
Adtalem Global Education